The Nuremberg trials were held by the Allies against representatives of the defeated Nazi Germany, for plotting and carrying out invasions of other countries, and other crimes, in World War II.

Between 1939 and 1945, Nazi Germany invaded many countries across Europe, inflicting 27 million deaths in the Soviet Union alone. Proposals for how to punish the defeated Nazi leaders ranged from a show trial (the Soviet Union) to summary executions (the United Kingdom). In mid-1945, France, the Soviet Union, the United Kingdom, and the United States agreed to convene a joint tribunal in Nuremberg, with the Nuremberg Charter as its legal instrument. Between 20 November 1945 and 1 October 1946, the International Military Tribunal (IMT) tried 21 of the most important surviving leaders of Nazi Germany in the political, military, and economic spheres, as well as six German organizations. The purpose of the trial was not just to convict the defendants but also to assemble irrefutable evidence of Nazi crimes, offer a history lesson to the defeated Germans, and delegitimize the traditional German elite.

The IMT focused on the crime of aggression—plotting and waging aggressive war, which the verdict declared "the supreme international crime" because "it contains within itself the accumulated evil of the whole". Most of the defendants were also charged with war crimes and crimes against humanity. Twelve further trials were conducted by the United States against lower-level perpetrators, which focused more on the Holocaust. Although controversial at the time for their use of ex post facto law, the trials' innovation of holding individuals responsible for violations of international law established international criminal law.

Origin

Between 1939 and 1945, Nazi Germany waged war across Europe, invading Czechoslovakia, Poland, the Low Countries, France, Denmark, Norway, Yugoslavia, Greece, and the Soviet Union, among others. German aggression was accompanied by immense brutality in occupied areas and the systematic murder of millions of Jews in the Holocaust. War losses in the Soviet Union alone included 27 million dead, mostly civilians, which was th of the prewar population.

In early 1942, representatives of eight governments-in-exile in the United Kingdom issued a declaration on Punishment for War Crimes, which demanded an international court to try the Axis crimes committed in occupied countries. The United States and United Kingdom refused to endorse this proposal, citing the failure of war crimes prosecutions after World War I. Soviet jurist Aron Trainin developed the concept of crimes against peace (waging aggressive war) which would later be central to the proceedings at Nuremberg. Trainin's ideas were reprinted in the West and widely adopted. On 1 November 1943, the Soviet Union, United Kingdom, and United States issued the Moscow Declaration to "give full warning" to the Nazi leadership of the Allies' intent to "pursue them to the uttermost ends of the earth…in order that justice may be done". The declaration also stated that those high-ranking Nazis who had committed crimes in several countries would be dealt with jointly.

Of all the Allies, the Soviet Union lobbied most intensely for trying the defeated German leaders for aggression in addition to war crimes. The Soviet Union wanted to hold a show trial similar to the 1930s Moscow trials, in order to demonstrate the Nazi leaders' guilt and build a case for war reparations to rebuild the Soviet economy, which had been devastated by the war. The United States insisted on a fair trial as a means of reforming Germany. Planners in the United States Department of War were drawing up plans for an international tribunal in late 1944 and early 1945. The British government was still opposed, unable to see the benefit of such a trial and preferring summary execution of Nazi leaders. The exact form that retribution would take was left unresolved at the Yalta Conference in February 1945. On 2 May, at the San Francisco Conference, the United States' new president Harry S. Truman announced the formation of an international military tribunal. On 8 May, Germany surrendered unconditionally.

Establishment

Legal basis

At the London Conference, held from 26 June to 2 August 1945, representatives of France, the Soviet Union, the United Kingdom, and the United States negotiated the exact form that the trial would take. Until the end of the negotiations, it was not clear that any trial would be held at all, due to acrimonious disputes over fundamental matters; the American delegation threatened to walk out. 

The Nuremberg Charter upended the traditional view of international law by holding individuals, rather than states, responsible for breaches of international law. The offenses that would be prosecuted were crimes against peace, crimes against humanity, and war crimes. At the conference, it was debated whether wars of aggression were prohibited in existing international customary law; regardless, before the charter was adopted there was no law providing for criminal responsibility for aggression. War crimes already existed in international law as criminal violations of the laws and customs of war. Although a novel construct, "crimes against humanity" covered acts that were already prohibited by the laws of most countries. 

The final version of the charter only gave the court the ability to punish those crimes against humanity that had been committed "in connection with any crimes within the jurisdiction of the Tribunal". Especially the United States wanted to avoid countenancing any rule that would give an international court jurisdiction over a government's treatment of its own citizens. The charter limited the jurisdiction of the court to Germany's actions because the Allies did not want to answer to an international court for their own actions; only Germans could be tried. Article 7 prevented the defendants from claiming immunity for their actions under the act of state doctrine, and the plea of acting under superior orders was left for the judges to decide. The trial was held under modified common law. 

The negotiators decided that the tribunal's permanent seat would be in Berlin, while the trial would be held at the Palace of Justice in Nuremberg. Located in the American occupation zone, Nuremberg was a symbolic location as the site of Nazi rallies. The Palace of Justice was relatively intact but needed to be renovated for the trial due to bomb damage; it had an attached prison where the defendants could be held. On 8 August, the Nuremberg Charter was signed in London. Nineteen states ratified the charter and were admitted as observers.

Judges and prosecutors
In early 1946, there were a thousand employees from the four countries' delegations in Nuremberg, of which about two-thirds were from the United States. Besides legal professionals, there were many social-science researchers, psychologists, translators and interpreters, and graphic designers, the latter to make the many charts used during the trial. Each state appointed a prosecution team and two judges, one being an alternate. 

The United States' chief prosecutor was Supreme Court justice Robert H. Jackson. The United States prosecution believed that Nazism was the product of a German deviation from Western history (the Sonderweg thesis) and sought to correct this deviation with a trial that would serve both retributive and educational purposes. As the numerically strongest delegation, it would take on the bulk of the prosecutorial effort. At Jackson's recommendation, the United States appointed judges Francis Biddle and John Parker. The British chief prosecutor was Hartley Shawcross, assisted by David Maxwell Fyfe, who had been the attorney general in Churchill's government. Although the chief British judge, Sir Geoffrey Lawrence (Lord Justice of Appeal), was the nominal president of the tribunal, in practice Biddle exercised more authority. 

The French prosecutor, François de Menthon, had just overseen trials of the leaders of Vichy France; he resigned in January 1946 and was replaced by Auguste Champetier de Ribes. The French judges were Henri Donnedieu de Vabres, a professor of criminal law, and alternate Robert Falco, who had represented France at the London Conference. The French government tried to appoint staff who were not tainted by collaboration with the Vichy regime; some appointments were of those who had been in the French resistance. Because the Soviet Union expected a show trial, its appointees were familiar with this form. Initially, it was planned that Iona Nikitchenko, who had presided over the Moscow trials, would serve as the chief prosecutor, but he was appointed as a judge and replaced by Roman Rudenko, a show trial prosecutor chosen for his skill as an orator. The Soviet judges and prosecutors were not permitted to make any major decisions without consulting a commission in Moscow led by Soviet politician Andrei Vyshinsky; the resulting delays hampered the Soviet effort to set the agenda. The Soviet personnel's lack of knowledge of English, lack of interpreters, and unfamiliarity with diplomacy and international institutions also limited their influence.

Indictment

The work of drafting the indictment was divided up by the national delegations. The British worked on putting together the aggressive war charge; the French and Soviet delegations were assigned the task of covering crimes against humanity and war crimes committed on the Western Front and the Eastern Front, respectively. The United States delegation outlined the overall Nazi conspiracy and criminality of Nazi organizations. After this division of formulating the charges, the British and American delegations decided to work jointly in drafting the charges of conspiracy to wage aggressive war. On 17 September, the various delegations met to discuss the indictment.

The charge of conspiracy was spearheaded by the United States prosecution and was less popular with the other Allies. The conspiracy charge was used to charge the top Nazi leaders, as well as bureaucrats who had never killed anyone or perhaps even directly ordered killing. It was also a way to indirectly charge crimes committed before the beginning of World War II, which the charter placed outside the court's jurisdiction. Conspiracy charges were especially central to the cases against propagandists and industrialists; the former were charged with providing the ideological justification for war and other crimes, while the latter were accused of economic mobilization without which no war would have been possible.

The problem of translating the indictment and evidence into the three official languages of the tribunal, as well as German, was severe due to the scale of the task and difficulty in recruiting interpreters, especially in the Soviet Union. Vyshinsky demanded extensive corrections to the crimes-against-peace charges, especially regarding the role of the German–Soviet pact in starting World War II. Jackson also rewrote the indictment with the intent of keeping the proceedings under American control by separating out an overall conspiracy charge from the other three charges. The division of labor, and the haste with which the indictment was prepared, resulted in duplication, imprecise language, and lack of attribution of specific charges to individual defendants.

Defendants

Some of the most prominent Nazis—Adolf Hitler, Heinrich Himmler, and Joseph Goebbels—had committed suicide and therefore could not be tried. The prosecutors wanted to try representative leaders of German politics, economy, and military; and the Americans had a list of 70 names at the London Conference. Most of the defendants had surrendered to the United States or United Kingdom. 

The defendants, who were largely unrepentant, included former cabinet ministers: Franz von Papen (who had brought Hitler to power); Joachim von Ribbentrop (foreign minister), Wilhelm Frick (interior minister), and Alfred Rosenberg, minister for the occupied eastern territories. Also prosecuted were leaders of the German economy, such as Gustav Krupp (of the conglomerate Krupp AG), former Reichsbank president Hjalmar Schacht, and economic planners Albert Speer and Walther Funk, along with Speer's subordinate and head of the forced labor program, Fritz Sauckel. The military leaders were Hermann Göring, Wilhelm Keitel, Alfred Jodl, Erich Raeder, and Karl Dönitz. Also on trial were propagandists Julius Streicher and Hans Fritzsche; Rudolf Hess, Hitler's deputy who had flown to Britain in 1941; Hans Frank, governor-general of the General Governorate of Poland; Hitler Youth leader Baldur von Schirach; Arthur Seyss-Inquart, Reich Commissioner for the Netherlands; and Ernst Kaltenbrunner, the leader of Himmler's Reich Main Security Office.

Although the list of defendants was finalized on 29 August, as late as October, Jackson demanded changes and expansion of the defendants list, but this was rejected. Of the 24 men indicted, Martin Bormann was tried in absentia, as the Allies were unaware of his death; Krupp was too ill to stand trial; and Robert Ley committed suicide. Göring, the most famous surviving Nazi, headlined the trial. Former Nazis were allowed to serve as counsel and by mid-November all defendants had lawyers. The defendants' lawyers jointly appealed to the court, claiming it did not have jurisdiction against the accused; but this motion was rejected. The defense lawyers saw themselves as acting on behalf of their clients, but also the German nation; they prioritized the Wehrmacht's reputation over the lives of the generals on trial. Initially, the Americans had planned to try fourteen organizations and their leaders, but this was narrowed to six: the Reich Cabinet, the Leadership Corps of the Nazi Party, the Gestapo, the SA, the SS and the SD, and the General Staff and High Command of the Wehrmacht. The aim was to have these organizations declared criminal, so that their members could be tried expeditiously for membership in a criminal organization. Senior American officials believed that convicting organizations was a good way of showing that not just the top German leaders were responsible for crimes, without condemning the entire German people.

Evidence

Over the summer, all of the national delegations struggled to gather evidence for the upcoming trial. Institutional rivalries hampered the search. The American and British prosecutors focused on documentary evidence and affidavits rather than testimony from survivors, as the latter was considered less reliable and more liable to accusations of bias, but at the expense of reducing public interest in the proceedings. The American prosecution drew on reports of the Office of Strategic Services and information provided by the YIVO Institute for Jewish Research and the American Jewish Committee. Overall, the prosecution called 37 witnesses compared to the defense's 83, not including 19 defendants who testified on their own behalf.

The charter allowed the admissibility of any evidence deemed to have probative value, including depositions. Because of the loose evidentiary rules, photographs, charts, maps, and films played an important role in making incredible crimes believable. After the American prosecution flooded the trial with untranslated evidence, the judges insisted that all of the evidence be read into the record, which slowed the trial. The bringing of conspiracy charges also slowed the trial, as the same evidence ended up being read out multiple times, when it was relevant to both substantive and conspiracy charges.

Course of the trial
The International Military Tribunal began trial on 20 November 1945, after postponement requests from the Soviet prosecution, who wanted more time to prepare its case, were rejected. All defendants pleaded not guilty. As Jackson made clear, the purpose of the trial was not just to convict the defendants but also to assemble irrefutable evidence of Nazi crimes, establish individual responsibility and the crime of aggression in international law, offer a history lesson to the defeated Germans, delegitimize the traditional German elite, and allow the Allies to distance themselves from appeasement. Jackson maintained that while the United States did "not seek to convict the whole German people of crime", neither did the trial "serve to absolve the whole German people except 21 men in the dock". Nevertheless, defense lawyers (although not most of the defendants) often argued that the prosecution was trying to promote German collective guilt and forcefully countered this as a strawman argument. According to historian Kim Christian Priemel, the conspiracy charge "invited apologetic interpretations: narratives of absolute, totalitarian dictatorship, run by society's lunatic fringe, of which the Germans had been the first victims rather than agents, collaborators, and fellow travellers".

American prosecution

On 21 November, Jackson gave the opening speech for the prosecution. He described the fact that the defeated Nazis received a trial as "one of the most significant tributes that Power has ever paid to Reason". Jackson's focus was on the aggressive war charge, which he described as the root of the crimes against humanity and of war crimes. He promoted an intentionalist view of the Nazi state and its overall conspiracy to commit all of the crimes mentioned in the indictment. The speech was favorably received by the prosecution, the tribunal, the audience, historians, and even the defendants.

Much of the American case focused on the development of the Nazi conspiracy before the outbreak of war. The American prosecution became derailed during attempts to provide evidence of the German annexation of Austria. On 29 November, the prosecution was unprepared to continue presenting on the invasion of Czechoslovakia, and instead screened Nazi Concentration and Prison Camps. The film, compiled from footage of the liberation of Nazi concentration camps, shocked both the defendants and the judges, who adjourned the trial. The American prosecutors were not any more effective when presenting documentary evidence on the conspiracy to commit crimes against humanity, and ended up reaching a "saturation point of horror" by their indiscriminate selection and disorganized presentation of evidence without tying it to specific defendants. The Americans summoned Einsatzgruppen commander Otto Ohlendorf, who testified about the murder of 80,000 people by those under his command, and SS general Erich von dem Bach-Zelewski, who admitted that German anti-partisan warfare was little more than a cover for the mass murder of Jews.

British prosecution

On 12 December, Shawcross gave the opening speech for the British. Unlike Jackson, he attempted to minimize the novelty of the aggression charges. The British case covered invasions, from that of Poland to that of the Soviet Union, which Shawcross covered in the second part of his speech; these charges took three days to present, with Maxwell Fyfe detailing 15 treaties broken by Germany.

In mid-December the Americans switched to presenting the case against the indicted organizations, while in January both the British and Americans presented evidence against individual defendants.

French prosecution
From 17 January to 7 February 1946, France presented its charges and supporting evidence. In contrast to the other prosecution teams, the French prosecution emphasized how Nazi ideology and pan-Germanism had led to the Nazis' crimes, and delved into the Sonderweg theory of Germany's development in the nineteenth century. The French prosecutors, more than their British or American counterparts, emphasized the guilt of the German people; they barely mentioned the charge of aggressive war and instead focused on forced labor, economic plunder, massacres, and Germanization. Unlike the British and American prosecution strategy, which focused on using German documents to make their case, the French prosecutors took the perspective of the victims, submitting postwar police reports and calling eleven witnesses. Ultimately, the French prosecution was unable to convince the court that Germanization was a crime against humanity, and incidents such as the German annexation of Alsace–Lorraine went unmentioned in the final verdict. The only part of the French charges that were accepted by the judges was the deportation of Jews from France and other parts of Western Europe.

Soviet prosecution

On 8 February, the Soviet prosecution opened its case with a speech by Rudenko that covered all four prosecution charges, highlighting both aggressive war and the devastation of Eastern Europe and listing many crimes committed by the German occupiers against the Soviet people. The next week, the Soviet prosecution suddenly produced former field marshal Friedrich von Paulus, captured after the Battle of Stalingrad, as a witness and questioned him about the preparations for the invasion of the Soviet Union. Paulus incriminated his former associates, pointing to Keitel, Jodl, and Göring as the defendants most responsible for the war. 

More so than other delegations, Soviet prosecutors showed the gruesome details of German mistreatment of prisoners of war and forced laborers, as well as the systematic murder of Jews in eastern Europe. Although these aspects had already been covered by the American prosecution, Soviet prosecutors introduced new evidence from Extraordinary State Commission reports and interrogations of senior enemy officers. Lev Smirnov presented evidence on the Lidice massacre in Czechoslovakia, adding that such destruction of villages had occurred throughout eastern Europe. Evidence was presented on the murder of children, attempts to cover up atrocities, systematic plunder of occupied territories, and confiscation or destruction of cultural heritage. The Soviet prosecution also attempted to fabricate German responsibility for the Katyn massacre, which had in fact been committed by the Soviet Union. By early 1946, Western prosecutors were uneasy about the Katyn charge, although they never publicly rejected it for fear of casting the entire proceedings into question. The defense presented evidence of Soviet responsibility, and Katyn was not mentioned in the verdict. The inclusion of Katyn in the charges undermined the credibility of Soviet evidence in general.

Inspired by the films shown by the American prosecution, the Soviet Union commissioned three films for the trial: The German Fascist Destruction of the Cultural Treasures of the Peoples of the USSR, Atrocities Committed by the German Fascist Invaders in the USSR, and The German Fascist Destruction of Soviet Cities, using footage from Soviet filmmakers as well as shots from German newsreels. The second film included footage of the liberation of Majdanek and the liberation of Auschwitz and was considered even more disturbing than the American concentration camp film. The Soviet Union also called two Holocaust survivors as witnesses, Samuel Rajzman—a Treblinka survivor—and poet Abraham Sutzkever, who eloquently described the murder of tens of thousands of Jews from Vilna, although their testimony did not directly incriminate any of the defendants. The Soviet prosecution case was generally well received and presented compelling evidence about the suffering of the Soviet people and the Soviet contribution to victory.

Defense

From March to July 1946, the defense presented its counterarguments. None of the defendants tried to assert that the Nazis' crimes had not occurred; instead, they attempted to divert blame from their own actions. Some defendants denied their involvement in, or knowledge of, certain crimes, even resorting to implausible lies. The defendants tried to blame their crimes on Hitler, who was mentioned 1,200 times during the trial—more than the top five defendants combined. Other absent and dead men including Himmler, Reinhard Heydrich, Adolf Eichmann, and Bormann were also blamed. In contrast, most defendants avoided incriminating each other. Although a few defense lawyers inverted the arguments of the prosecution to assert that the Germans' authoritarian mindset and obedience to the state exonerated them from any personal guilt, most rejected such arguments. Most defendants argued their own insignificance within the Nazi system, but Göring took the opposite approach, presenting himself as Hitler's loyalist and expecting that while he would be executed, the German people would eventually appreciate his loyalty. 

Despite the fact that the charter did not recognize a tu quoque defense, such arguments were repeatedly raised during the trial. The Nuremberg Laws were compared to discriminatory laws in the United States. Defense lawyer  repeatedly tried to disclose the secret protocols of the German–Soviet pact. Six defendants were charged with the German invasion of Norway, and their lawyers argued that this invasion was undertaken to prevent a British invasion; a cover-up prevented the defense from capitalizing on this argument. United States admiral Chester Nimitz testified that the United States had used the same methods of submarine warfare that the German admirals were accused of; Dönitz's counsel successfully argued that this meant that such actions could not be crimes. The judges barred most evidence on Allied misdeeds from being heard in court.

In order to appease concerns about fair process, the defendants were allowed a free hand with their witnesses and a great deal of irrelevant testimony was heard. The defendants' witnesses sometimes managed to exculpate them, but other witnesses—including Rudolf Höss, the former commandant of Auschwitz, and Hans Bernd Gisevius, a member of the German resistance—effectively incriminated the defendants. Midway through the trial, Winston Churchill's Iron Curtain speech denouncing the Soviet threat delighted the defense. Over the course of the trial, Western judges allowed the defendants additional leeway to denounce the Soviet Union, which was ultimately revealed to be a co-conspirator in the outbreak of World War II. The United States controlled the prison where the defendants and some of the witnesses were held, and tried its best to shut the Soviets out of the proceedings. In the context of the brewing Cold War, the trial became a means of condemning not only Germany but also the Soviet Union.

Closing
On 31 August, closing arguments were presented. Over the course of the trial, crimes against humanity and especially against Jews (who were mentioned as victims of Nazi atrocities far more than any other group) came to upstage the aggressive war charge. In contrast to the opening prosecution statements, all eight closing statements highlighted the Holocaust; and the French and British prosecutors made this the main charge, as opposed to that of aggression. During the closing statements, most defendants disappointed the judges by their lies and denial. Speer managed to distinguish himself from other defendants, giving the impression of apologizing, although without assuming personal guilt or naming any victims other than the German people. On 2 September, the court recessed; and the judges retreated into seclusion to decide the verdict and sentences, which had been under discussion since June. The verdict was drafted by British alternate judge Norman Birkett. All eight judges participated in the deliberations, but the alternates could not cast a vote.

Verdict
The International Military Tribunal agreed with the prosecution that aggression was the gravest charge against the accused, stating in its judgement that because war in general is evil, "To initiate a war of aggression, therefore, is not only an international crime; it is the supreme international crime differing only from other war crimes in that it contains within itself the accumulated evil of the whole." The judges did not attempt to define aggression and decided not to mention the retroactivity of the charges in the verdict. The official interpretation of the IMT held that all of the charges had a solid basis in customary international law, which was elaborated in the verdict. The judgement argued that aggressive war had already been illegal, even if no one had been punished for it, and therefore the German leaders could not count on immunity from prosecution. The judges were aware that both the Allies and the Axis had planned or committed acts of aggression, writing the verdict carefully to avoid discrediting either the Allied governments or the tribunal. 

The judgment found that there was a premeditated conspiracy to commit crimes against peace, the goals of the conspiracy being "the disruption of the European order as it had existed since the Treaty of Versailles" and "the creation of a Greater Germany beyond the frontiers of 1914". Contrary to the prosecution, the verdict dated the planning of aggression to the 1937 Hossbach Memorandum and not to the founding of the Nazi Party. Through a compromise among the judges, the charge of conspiracy was narrowed to a conspiracy to wage aggressive war. The judges did not agree that the conspiracy extended to anyone who participated in the affairs of the Nazi government, only taking being present at the high-level meetings discussing war plans in 1937 and 1939 as evidence of belonging to the conspiracy. Only eight defendants were convicted on that charge; all of whom were also found guilty of crimes against peace. All 22 defendants were charged with crimes against peace, and 12 were convicted. The war crimes and crimes-against-humanity charges held up the best, with only two defendants who were charged being acquitted on those charges. The judges interpreted crimes against humanity narrowly; they determined that crimes against German Jews before 1939 were not under the court's jurisdiction because the prosecution had not proven a connection to aggressive war. 

Four organizations were ruled to be criminal: the Leadership Corps of the Nazi Party, the SS, the Gestapo, and the SD, although some lower ranks and subgroups were excluded. The SA, the Reich Cabinet, and the General Staff and High Command were not ruled to be criminal organizations. In the latter case, the Wehrmacht leadership was not considered an organization within the meaning of the charter; but this verdict was later misrepresented as an acquittal of the criminality of the Wehrmacht, forming one of the foundations of the clean Wehrmacht myth. 

The exact sentences to be given each defendant were debated at length by the judges. Twelve of the defendants were sentenced to death (Göring, Ribbentrop, Keitel, Kaltenbrunner, Rosenberg, Frank, Frick, Streicher, Sauckel, Jodl, Seyss-Inquart, and Bormann). On 16 October, ten were hanged, with Göring committing suicide the day before. Seven defendants (Hess, Funk, Raeder, Dönitz, Schirach, Speer, and Neurath) were sent to Spandau Prison to serve their sentences. All three acquittals (Papen, Schacht, and Fritzsche) were based on a deadlock between the judges; these acquittals surprised observers. Despite being accused of the same crimes, Sauckel was sentenced to death, while Speer was given a prison sentence because the judges considered that he could reform. Nikichenko released a dissent approved by Moscow that rejected all the acquittals, called for a death sentence for Hess, and convicted all the organizations. The judges proved their independence from the governments that appointed them, the defendants were seen as receiving due process, and the evidence of guilt amassed by the prosecution was overwhelming.

Nuremberg Military Tribunals

Initially, it was planned to hold a second international tribunal for German industrialists, but this was never held because of differences between the Allies. Twelve military trials were convened solely by the United States in the same courtroom that had hosted the International Military Tribunal. These trials were held under Law No. 10 issued by the Joint Chiefs of Staff. Pursuant to this law, United States forces had arrested almost 100,000 Germans as war criminals. The Office of Chief Counsel for War Crimes identified 2,500 major war criminals, of whom 177 were tried. Many of the worst offenders were not prosecuted, for logistical or financial reasons.

One set of trials focused on the actions of German professionals: the Doctors' trial focused on human experimentation and euthanasia murders, the Judges' trial on the role of the judiciary in Nazi crimes, and the Ministries trial on the culpability of bureaucrats of German government ministries, especially the Foreign Office. Also on trial were industrialists—in the Flick trial, the IG Farben trial, and the Krupp trial—for using forced labor, looting property from Nazi victims, and funding SS atrocities. Members of the SS were tried in the Pohl trial, which focused on members of the SS Main Economic and Administrative Office that oversaw SS economic activity, including the Nazi concentration camps; the RuSHA trial of Nazi racial policies; and the Einsatzgruppen trial, in which members of the mobile killing squads were tried for the murder of more than one million people behind the Eastern Front. Luftwaffe general Erhard Milch was tried for using slave labor and deporting civilians. In the Hostages case, several generals were tried for executing thousands of hostages and prisoners of war, looting, using forced labor, and deporting civilians in the Balkans. Other generals were tried in the High Command Trial for plotting wars of aggression, issuing criminal orders, deporting civilians, using slave labor, and looting in the Soviet Union.

These trials emphasized the crimes committed during the Holocaust. The trials heard 1,300 witnesses, entered more than 30,000 documents into evidence, and generated 132,855 pages of transcripts, with the judgements themselves totaling 3,828 pages. The trials targeted 177 defendants and obtained 142 convictions, including 25 death sentences; the severity of sentencing was related to the defendant's proximity to mass murder. The case law of the trials fleshed out the skeleton provided by the Nuremberg charter and the IMT verdict.

Contemporary reactions

At the same time as the Nuremberg Charter was finalized, the Allies also signed the Potsdam Agreement, which provided for the mass expulsion of millions of Germans from central and eastern Europe, so that certain acts for which Nazis were convicted at Nuremberg were therefore made an official policy of the Allies. All four powers later fought independence movements using methods that had been ruled illegal at Nuremberg.

In all, 249 journalists were accredited to cover the IMT and 61,854 visitor tickets were issued. In France, some verdicts were met with outrage from the media and especially from organizations for deportees and resistance fighters, as they were perceived as too lenient. In the United Kingdom, although a variety of responses were reported, it was difficult to sustain interest in a long trial. Where the prosecution was disappointed by some of the verdicts, the defense could take satisfaction.

Many Germans at the time of the trials focused on finding food and shelter; few followed the trial closely. In a 1946 poll, 78 percent of Germans assessed the trial as fair, but four years later that had fallen to 38 percent, with 30 percent considering it unfair. Many Germans lumped criminal trials with denazification, internment, and confrontation with the concentration camps, as illegitimate victor's justice and the imposition of collective guilt. As the Cold War began, the rapidly changing political environment began to affect the effectiveness of the trials. The educational purpose of the Nuremberg Military Tribunals was a failure, in part because of the resistance to war crimes trials in German society, but also because of the United States Army's refusal to publish the trial record in German for fear it would undermine the fight against communism.

The German churches, both Catholic and Protestant, were vociferous proponents of amnesty, which had cross-party support in West Germany, which was established in 1949. By then, the Americans were hoping to use the offer of pardon to convicted war criminals in order to bind West Germany to the Western Bloc. Early releases of those convicted by the Nuremberg Military Tribunals began in 1949; and in 1951, High Commissioner John J. McCloy overturned most of the sentences. The last prisoner was released in 1958. The German public took the early releases as confirmation of what they saw as the illegitimacy of the trials. The IMT defendants required Soviet permission for release; Speer was not successful in obtaining early release, and Hess remained in prison until his death in 1987. By the late 1950s, the West German consensus on release began to erode, due to greater openness in political culture and new revelations of Nazi criminality, including the first trials of Nazi perpetrators in West German courts.

Legacy

The International Military Tribunal, and the drafters of its charter, invented international criminal law essentially from nothing. During the two decades after the trial, opinions were predominantly negative. The main legal criticisms of the trial focused on questions of retroactivity, selectivity, and jurisdiction. The most controversial charge was crimes against peace. The charge of crimes against humanity, the charge of conspiracy, and imposing criminal penalties on individuals for breaches of international law were also novel but attracted little criticism. Some defenders of the trial argued that the legal principle of nullum crimen sine lege (no crime without law) was not binding in international proceedings. The selectivity in trying Germans but not the Allies has garnered the most persistent criticism.

The International Military Tribunal for the Far East (Tokyo Trial) borrowed many of its ideas from the IMT, including all four charges. On 11 December 1946, the United Nations General Assembly unanimously passed a resolution affirming "the principles of international law recognized by the Charter of the Nuremberg Tribunal and the judgment of the Tribunal". In 1950, the International Law Commission drafted the Nuremberg principles to codify international criminal law, although the Cold War prevented the adoption of these principles until the 1990s. Further developments in international criminal law in the aftermath of the trials included the Genocide Convention (1948) and the Fourth Geneva Convention (1949). In the 1990s, a revival of international criminal law included the establishment of ad hoc international criminal tribunals for Yugoslavia (ICTY) and Rwanda (ICTR), which were widely seen as part of the legacy of the Nuremberg and Tokyo trials. The Rome Statute establishing a permanent International Criminal Court (ICC), which had been proposed in 1953, was finally agreed to in 1998. 

The trials were the first use of simultaneous interpretation, which stimulated technical advances in translation methods. The Palace of Justice houses a museum on the trial and the courtroom became a tourist attraction, drawing 13,138 visitors in 2005. The IMT is one of the most well-studied trials in history, and it has also been the subject of an abundance of books and scholarly publications, along with motion pictures such as Judgment at Nuremberg (1961) and The Memory of Justice (1976).

References

Sources

External links

Transcript and other documents (Avalon Project)

 
1940s in Germany
1940s in law
Holocaust trials
Crimes against humanity
Crime of aggression
International courts and tribunals
Nazi war crimes trials
trials
Trials in Germany

Articles containing video clips
Ex post facto law
Courts and tribunals established in 1945
Courts and tribunals disestablished in 1946